Norfolk Senior High School is one of the largest high schools in northeastern Nebraska.

Athletics 
Norfolk Senior High School is a member of the Nebraska School Activities Association and competes in the Heartland Athletic Conference. The school mascot is the Panther.

Notable alumni
Douglas Bruster Class of 1981
Jared Schuurmans

References

Public high schools in Nebraska